Antoine Durafour (12 August 1876, Saint-Étienne – 25 April 1932) was a French politician. He represented the Radical Party in the Chamber of Deputies from 1910 to 1932. From 1925 to 1926 he was Minister of Labour and Social Security provisions. From 1930 to 1932 he was mayor of Saint-Étienne.

References

1876 births
1932 deaths
Radical Party (France) politicians
French Ministers of Labour and Social Affairs
Members of the 10th Chamber of Deputies of the French Third Republic
Members of the 11th Chamber of Deputies of the French Third Republic
Members of the 12th Chamber of Deputies of the French Third Republic
Members of the 13th Chamber of Deputies of the French Third Republic
Members of the 14th Chamber of Deputies of the French Third Republic
Mayors of Saint-Étienne